HD 64484 (HR 3081) is a solitary star in the southern circumpolar constellation Volans. With an apparent magnitude of 5.76, it is faintly visible to the naked eye under dark skies.

HD 64484 has a stellar classification of B9 V, indicating that it is an ordinary B-type main-sequence star. However, a slightly enlarged radius of  yields a luminosity 140 times that of the Sun. This is due to HD 64484 completing 80.6% of its main sequence lifetime at an age of 339 million years.

References

Volans (constellation)
064484
PD-65 827
3081
038210
B-type main-sequence stars
Volantis, 19